, also known as Doraemon: The Hero 2009 then later as Doraemon: The New Record of Nobita Spaceblazer is a 2009 Japanese animated science fiction neo-western film. It's the 29th of Doraemon films series. It is a remake of the 1981 movie The Records of Nobita, Spaceblazer.

This is the first film released during the celebration of TV Asahi's 50th Anniversary. It was voted the No.1 Movie in Japan as of March 9, 2009. It ranked as the 4th highest grossing Japanese animated film in 2009.

Synopsis 
Two siblings named Roppuru and Morina were playing at a park. Suddenly, they feel an earthquake on the Koya Koya Planet. The massive earthquake was destroying the entire planet. Everyone has to escape using a giant ship; however, a sudden bolt of lightning damages the ship. The Professor (Morina's father) wants to fix the spaceship, but before he can, another lightning strike takes him to another dimension.

Nobita and his friends lose a ball and must retrieve it from a group of tough baseball players. These players chase him and drop Nobita down a manhole.

Meanwhile, two creatures from the alternate universe, Roppuru and Chamii, escape from an enemy ship. While Nobita is sleeping, he suddenly feels an earthquake-like tremble underneath him. A little rabbit from the alternate universe named Chamii opens the door between dimensions using a hammer. Nobita wakes up, while Doraemon hears somebody stealing food from the fridge. This leads Chamii to be caught by Doraemon and Nobita. She shows them the passageway leading through Nobita's floor into the spaceship. After they enter the spaceship, they see Koya Koya Planet and meet Roppuru (12 years old).

Roppuru takes Nobita to his friend Morina, who ignores them. On the next visit, Nobita brings his friends with him and they play in a meadow. There they are attacked by miners who want crystals from the planet's crust. All of them escape to their own dimension.

The next day, Nobita is scolded by his mother for hiding his test paper. Nobita decides to temporarily escape to Koya Koya planet and meet Roppuru. Nobita is then sucked into another dimension and reaches another planet. There he gets chased by a spaceship, only to be saved by one of Doraemon's gadgets.

On the next visit, Nobita and Doraemon encounter the same miners and get into a fight again. The miners are defeated along with their ship. Roppuru tells the town's people about Doraemon and Nobita, but the miners took the ship, so they had no evidence to prove Nobita's efforts. The miners continue to return whilst Doraemon and Nobita save them every time. This causes the miners' leader to know about Doraemon and Nobita, devising a trap to catch them and ultimately decides to take care of them himself.

The leader questions Morina and is forced to lead him to Nobita and Doraemon through a secret passage. The leader attaches a bomb to the dimensional door such that anyone who opens it will be blasted away. The people of Koya Koya planet are told to leave the planet as the leaders plan to blast it. Chamii tries to enter the dimensional door and is blasted away because Doraemon and Nobita tried to open the door. However, she is saved by Roppuru and he leaves for the mining resort. She tries to stop him but a pipe hits her head and she falls unconscious.

On the other side, Nobita's mother orders him to study hard and she calls Doraemon to keep an eye on Nobita. Chammi regains consciousness and tells Clem that Roppuru has gone to the mining resort all alone. She finds the door, opens it with Clem's help and tells Nobita that Koya Koya is in trouble. They get to know that the doors are about to get closed forever.

Nobita and Doraemon get through the door while Shizuka runs away to call Gian and Suneo. Doraemon and Nobita fight with the Miner's robot and ultimately reach the leader and Nobita defeats him. The button for destruction is pressed and the leader flees away, injuring Morina. Doraemon, Nobita, Roppuru, and Morina use the robotic machine to take the destructive device away from the planet into space, where it explodes. Due to some dimensional distortion, Morina enters another dimension and finds her father. The rest of them are able to return to their home.

Cast

Characters

Recurring characters 
Doraemon - A blue robotic cat sent from the future to assist and guide Nobita Nobi, a fifth grader. He has a four dimensional pocket that can store objects called gadgets, technology from the future that aids them in their adventures.
Nobita Nobi - A boy with poor grades, poor social life, and negative emotions. His descendant from the future sends Doraemon to help guide him. Rather of being poor at studies and sports, he is a person with a pure heart, great imagination and marksmanship skill. He always cares for other.
Shizuka Minamoto - Nobita's Classmate and Crush. (Minor Appearance)
Takeshi Gouda aka Gian/ Giant - Nobita's Frenemy. (Minor Appearance)
Suneo Honekawa - Nobita's Frenemy and Gian's Sidekick. (Minor Appearance)

Movie characters 
 He is a resident of Koya Koya Planet. He and Nobita are best friends. The formed a deep bond throughout the progress of the movie.
  It is a rabbit like creature. She is very much fond of Doraemon and Nobita
  -Roppuru's sister. She and Nobita were great friends. She admired Nobita for his Marksmanship and Cat Scraddle (Ayatori) Skills. She asked Nobita to live with them forever. She also gave him a snow flower and a bouquet of it when he was leaving the planet.
  - Lopplc's neighbour.
 Morina (モリナ) - She is Roppuru's Older Cousin.
 Guillermin
 Doubt
 Uno

Animals on Koya Koya  
Many animals live on Koya Koya.
 Toad fish - Synthesis of fish and frogs. Like a frog in winter hibernation.
 Dendenwani - As tall as a man. Synthesis of snails and alligator.
 Avian Ototo - Synthesis of fish and birds. Garutaito ore using Tokai Tokai stars blast off in the winter.
 Pao Pao - Two people as tall as an elephant's foot. Wild animals to humans are Garnai. The original author of the "black jungle heavy drinker," was the appearance of the character.
 Dakkusukirin - Resembles a dachshund i.

DVD 
A special DVD version of this movie was released on December 12, 2009. It includes 2 bonus features including Nobita & Lopplc and The Making of The Movie.

Music 
 Opening song: 『夢をかなえてドラえもん』 (Dream comes true, Doraemon), sung by MAO.
 Ending song: 『大切にするよ』 (Taisetsu ni Suru Yo), sung by Kou Shibasaki.
 Insert song: 『キミが笑う世界』, sung by Ayaka Wilson.

References

External links 
 Official Website
 

2009 anime films
2000s children's animated films
Record of Nobita's Spaceblazer
Anime film remakes
Animated films about extraterrestrial life
Animated films about cats
Films set on fictional planets
Japanese animated science fiction films
Robot films